Oligomeris is a genus of flowering plants belonging to the family Resedaceae.

Its native range includes the southwestern United States, Mexico, Southern and Northern Africa, Somalia, Crete, southwestern Asia, Pakistan and China.

Species
Species:

Oligomeris dipetala 
Oligomeris dregeana 
Oligomeris linifolia

References

Resedaceae
Brassicales genera